Giles Quintin Sykes Whittell (born 1966) is an English author and journalist who has worked for The Times as Correspondent in Russia and the United States.

Whittell was educated at Sherborne School and Christ's College, Cambridge (B.A. 1988). He has worked for The Times of London since 1993, first as US West Coast Correspondent from 1993 to 1999 and later as Moscow Correspondent (1999–2001) and Washington Bureau Chief (2009–2011). As of 2019 he is the paper's chief leader writer.
 
His books  include Lambada Country (1992), Extreme Continental (1994), Spitfire Women of World War II (2007) and Bridge of Spies, a New York Times bestselling account of the Cold War spy swap between Rudolf Abel, Gary Powers and Frederic Pryor on Berlin's Glienicke Bridge in 1962. The book was published in the US in 2010 and the United Kingdom in 2011.

His latest book, Snow: A Scientific and Cultural Exploration, will be published by Atria Books in November 2019.

References

1966 births
English journalists
British writers
Living people